Paul Joseph Jamin (9 February 1853 – 10 July 1903) was a French painter of the Academic Classicism school.

Life and career
Jamin was  born in Paris in 1853. He was the son of Jules Jamin, physicist and permanent secretary of the French Academy of Sciences. He married Augustine Marie Caroline Bastien in 1882, with whom he had four children.

He was a student of Gustave Boulanger.

His paintings were shown frequently at the Salon throughout the last quarter of the nineteenth century. One of his best-known paintings is Le Brenn et sa part de butin (1893), which depicts the Gaulish chieftain Brennus viewing his captives after the looting of Rome.

Jamin died in Paris on 10 July 1903.

References

External links

19th-century French painters
French male painters
20th-century French painters
20th-century French male artists
1853 births
1903 deaths
Academic art
Painters from Paris
19th-century French male artists